Auvergne (D654) is an Aquitaine-class frigate of the French Navy. The Aquitaine class were developed from the FREMM multipurpose frigate program.

Development and design 
In November 2005 France announced a contract of €3.5 billion for development and the first eight hulls, with options for nine more costing €2.95 billion split over two tranches (totaling 17).

Following the cancellation of the third and fourth of the s in 2005 on budget grounds, requirements for an air-defence derivative of the FREMM called FREDA were placed – with DCNS coming up with several proposals. Expectations were that the last two ships of the 17 FREMM planned would be built to FREDA specifications; however, by 2008 the plan was revised down to just 11 FREMM (9 ASW variants and 2 FREDA variants) at a cost of €8.75 billion (FY13, ~US$12 billion). The 11 ships would cost €670 million (~US$760m) each in FY2014, or €860m (~US$980m) including development costs. In 2015, the total number of ASW variants was further reduced to just six units, including Auvergne.

Construction and career 
Auvergne was developed as part of a joint Italian-French program known as FREMM, which was implemented to develop a new class of frigates for use by various European navies. Constructed from 2012. The frigate Auvergne was launched on 2 September 2015 and commissioned in 2018. 

In late 2021/early 2022, just prior to the  Russian invasion of Ukraine, the frigate deployed to the Black Sea for exercises with the Bulgarian and other NATO navies. The frigate departed the Black Sea prior to the outbreak of hostilities.

She was initially home ported at Toulon, but transferred to the naval base at Brest in December 2022.

References 

2015 ships
Aquitaine-class frigates
Ships built in France